Bert Gordon (April 8, 1895 – November 30, 1974) was an American comedian and voice actor who appeared in vaudeville, radio, and occasionally films.

Gordon was born Barney Gorodetsky. He appeared in many roles over his lengthy career and was known by the moniker "The Mad Russian".  He was a regular on The Eddie Cantor Program, and also appeared on The Jack Benny Program, and The Abbott and Costello Program.  In 1945 he starred in his own film vehicle, How Doooo You Do!!!, directed by Ralph Murphy; the film takes its title from Gordon's distinctive way of introducing himself, which became a catch phrase in the early 1940s.

Gordon played himself in an episode of The Dick Van Dyke Show in 1964 along with several other radio-era performers.

In popular culture
Gordon's character was parodied a number of times in Warner Bros. cartoons, including:
Bob Clampett's What's Cookin' Doc? (1944), in which Bugs Bunny wins a "Booby Prize Oscar", and tells it "I'll take youse to bed with me every night,", upon which the Oscar-like statue comes to life and says, in The Mad Russian's voice, "Do you mean it?".
Clampett's Russian Rhapsody (1944), in which a "Gremlin from the Kremlin" says "How do you doooo" with Gordon's inflections before hitting Hitler with a mallet.
Clampett's Hare Ribbin' (1944), in which the Gordon character, voiced by Sammy Wolfe, is a dog with red hair who chases Bugs Bunny.
Abbott and Costello, a contemporary comedy duo, parodied his "How do you dooooooo" catchphrase in an early 1940s episode of their radio series, which was later reissued on vinyl and audio cassette in the 1970s.

After 1942, Bert Gordon was no longer referred to on the Eddie Cantor Show as The Mad Russian, but as "Our Russian Friend," this presumably so as not to give offense to Stalin, the Russians having recently switched alliance so as to be on the side of the Allies. Following the defeat of Germany in the spring of 1945, and Russia then being at odds with the United States, Bert Gordon was dropped from the show entirely.

References

External links

"A Tale of Two Gordons" on the WFMU website

1895 births
1974 deaths
20th-century American male actors
American male comedians
American male radio actors
Male actors from New York City
Vaudeville performers
Comedians from New York City
20th-century American comedians
Burials at Eden Memorial Park Cemetery
Jewish American male actors
Jewish American male comedians
20th-century American Jews